JSAD may stand for:

Japanese School in Abu Dhabi, a Japanese-language international school
Journal of South Asian Development, a triannual development studies journal
Journal of Studies on Alcohol and Drugs, a scientific journal for research into drug use